"Pride N Joy" is a song written by American rapper Fat Joe. The song features Kanye West, Miguel, Jadakiss, Mos Def, DJ Khaled, Roscoe Dash and Busta Rhymes, although Kanye West and Roscoe Dash are the main features with Roscoe doing the hook and Kanye sharing the first verse with Joe. The other featured artists sing the intro and outro, which are the same. According to Joe the record had been mixed eight times by Kanye before its release, meaning a remix could be released in the future.

Music video
The music video was directed by Hype Williams and premiered August 26, 2012 on MTV Jams as the Jam of The Week. Mos Def was not available when the video was shot, so Ashanti took his place.

Remix
The official remix was released on September 17, 2012. The remix features Trey Songz, Pusha T, Ashanti and Miguel.

Track listing
 "Pride N Joy" (radio version)
 "Pride N Joy" (explicit version)

Charts

References

2012 singles
2012 songs
Fat Joe songs
Kanye West songs
Miguel (singer) songs
Jadakiss songs
Mos Def songs
DJ Khaled songs
Roscoe Dash songs
Busta Rhymes songs
Songs written by Kanye West
Music videos directed by Hype Williams
Songs written by Fat Joe
Songs written by Rico Love
Posse cuts
Songs written by Bink (record producer)
Songs written by Roscoe Dash